Ceroplesis semitrabeata is a species of beetle in the family Cerambycidae. It was described by Fairmaire in 1887. It is known from Malawi and Tanzania.

Varietas
 Ceroplesis semitrabeata var. puguana Fiedler, 1938
 Ceroplesis semitrabeata var. tomentosa Fiedler, 1938

References

semitrabeata
Beetles described in 1887